Hunts Green or Hunt's Green may refer to:

 Hunts Green, Berkshire, England, UK
 Hunt's Green, Buckinghamshire, England, UK
 Hunts Green, Warwickshire, England, UK

See also

 Green (disambiguation)
 Hunt (disambiguation)